The Lindenhof, in the old town of Zürich, Switzerland, is the historical site of the Roman castle, and the later Carolingian Kaiserpfalz. It is situated on Lindenhof hill, on the left side of the Limmat at the Schipfe.

In 1747, a second-century Roman tombstone was discovered at the site, bearing the oldest attestation of Turīcum, the Roman-era name of Zürich, as STA[tio] TURIC[ensis], at the time a tax-collection point. The castle remained intact during the early phase of Alemannic immigration in between the fifth and sixth centuries, but was derelict by the ninth century, when it was rebuilt as a residence for Louis the German. It later became dilapidated and used as a source of building stone by the 13th century.

The Lindenhof remained a place of civil assembly into modern times. In 1798, the citizens of Zürich swore the oath to the constitution of the Helvetic Republic on the Lindenhof.

In 1851, the Modestia cum Libertate Masonic Lodge (established in 1771) bought the residence Zum Paradies and built a masonic building on the southern side of the square.

In the early 21st century, it serves as a recreational space, a green oasis, and automobile-free zone in the old historic city centre.  Its elevated position makes it a popular location for tourists to get an overview of the geography of old Zürich.

In April, during the local holiday of Sechseläuten, the Lindenhof serves as the base of operations for whichever is the "guest canton" for that year.

See also 
 History of Zürich

Literature 
 Präsidialdepartement der Stadt Zürich, Statistik Stadt Zürich: Quartierspiegel Lindenhof. Zürich 2006 (PDF; 2.77 MB)

References

External links 
 Schipfe.ch 
 www.modestia-cum-libertate.ch/lindenhof.htm 
 view from the Lindenhof 

Altstadt (Zürich)
History of Zürich

de:Lindenhof (Zürcher Hügelzug)